Bally Gill (born 28 July 1992) is a British actor. He won the 2018  Ian Charleson Award for his performance as Romeo in the Royal Shakespeare Company production of Romeo and Juliet. Best known for his role as Neel Fisher in BBC drama Sherwood, he has also appeared as Agent Singh in Slow Horses, in the ITV crime series Manhunt, as well as the BBC medical comedy-drama This Is Going to Hurt. He makes his film debut in the forthcoming adaptation of the Alan Bennett play Allelujah in the role of Dr Valentine.

Early life 
Bally Gill was born in Coventry, West Midlands and graduated from Rose Bruford College in 2015.

Awards and nominations

References 

Living people
1992 births
Actors from Coventry
Alumni of Rose Bruford College
British male actors of Indian descent
British male stage actors